Conflict is a hex-based NES war game where the player is a commander who must lead their forces to victory. The player can earn fame points by occupying cities and airports and destroying units of the opponent's army; fame points are lost by losing units of one's army in battle or retreating from battles. The goal of each of the 16 scenarios is to destroy the enemy's flag tank. The first player controls the blue (Western Bloc) forces while the computer (or second player) controls red (Eastern Bloc) troops.

Each player starts with two factories, at least one of which specializes in air combat units and at least one of which specializes in ground warfare units. On each turn, the player can, if they still have a factory that has not been destroyed, produce one military unit. The more fame points the player has, the more powerful units they can produce (e.g. tanks instead of infantry). The computer always starts with more fame points than the player; since this state of affairs tends to produce an increasingly overwhelming materiel advantage if left unaddressed, the goal of depleting the computer's fame points, usually by destroying powerful red Army units, tends to be a high priority at the beginning of the game.

The hexagons can be plains, woods, mountains, barren terrain, shoals, seas, bridges, airports, towns, or factories. The terrain in each hexagon has an effect on maneuverability and the extent to which forces can take evasive action. Units can be repaired, refueled, and rearmed at cities or airports, depending on whether the unit is a ground or air unit. A sequel was released for the Super NES entitled Super Conflict.

Reception
The May 1990 issue of Nintendo Power magazine gave this video game an overall rating of 4 out of 5.

References

External links

1989 video games
Nintendo Entertainment System games
Nintendo Entertainment System-only games
Strategy video games
Vic Tokai games
Video games developed in Japan
Multiplayer and single-player video games